George Adrien Burridge (September 20, 1883 – March 11, 1969) was a teacher and political figure in Nova Scotia, Canada. He represented Yarmouth County in the Nova Scotia House of Assembly from 1960 to 1967 as a Progressive Conservative member.

Early life
Born in Hectanooga, Nova Scotia, he was the son of Ambroise Burridge and Rosalie Cottreau.

Before politics
He was the first principal of the Yarmouth Vocational School, the original public vocational training school in Nova Scotia.

Political career
In October 1960, he was appointed to the Executive Council of Nova Scotia as Minister without portfolio.

Posthumous
The current NSCC Burridge Campus in Yarmouth is named after him.

References

1883 births
1969 deaths
Progressive Conservative Association of Nova Scotia MLAs
Members of the Executive Council of Nova Scotia
Canadian educators
People from Digby County, Nova Scotia
People from Yarmouth, Nova Scotia
Acadian people